Rasul Rabadanovich Mirzaev (born 30 March 1986) is an Avar - Dargin mixed martial artist born in Russia.

Sports career and MMA 
Mirzaev began training at the Moscow-based Sambo-70 sports club in 2007. In November 2010, Mirzaev won first place at the combat sambo division of the World Sambo Championships that was held in Tashkent, Uzbekistan, submitting his opponent Baasankhun Damlanpurev from Mongolia in thirty seconds. In the same year, the Moscow Sambo Federation awarded Mirzaev with the Best Athlete of the Year in combat sambo.

Mirzaev is undefeated in his mixed martial arts career. His record currently stands at fourteen wins and no losses. His first win was in October 2009 at the Battle of Champions in Elista, in a duel with Danil Turinghe. In June 2010, he defeated Marat Pekov at Fight Nights – Battle of Moscow 1. In March 2010, Mirzayev defeated Evgeni Khavilov at Battle of Moscow 3. In May of that year, he won a fight with Roman Kishev at United Glory 14: 2010–2011 World Series Finals. After a near 2-year gap in his MMA career due to his criminal case, he made his return in March 2013 and has since won 9 straight fights. In July 2011, Mirzaev fought for the Euro-Asia Featherweight Championship title in the Fight Nights – Battle of Moscow 4 event. The Japanese MMA Super Star Masanori Kanehara lost to Mirzaev by technical knockout in less than two minutes.

On 16 November, 2016 he lost first time in MMA career to UFC veteran Levan Makashvili at Fight Nights 54 via unanimous decision.

Mirzaev faced Abdul-Rakhman Dudaev at ACA 138 on March 27, 2022. He lost the bout after being knocked out in the first round.

Criminal investigation and Assassination attempt 

According to the Moscow police, a disagreement between Mirzaev and a 19-year-old Ivan Agafonov took place on 13 August 2011 at 4 a.m., in the center of Moscow near a night club. Mirzaev punched Agafonov down to the pavement. Agafonov died in a hospital four days later. The Agafonov family agreed with the experts, who say the cause of the young man’s death was not a punch from Mirzaev, but the head trauma he sustained from falling on the pavement.

After the death of Agafonov, his mother said that doctors failed to provide her son with necessary help. The Moscow Department of Health set up a commission composed of several neurosurgeons. They studied the actions of their colleagues and concluded that physicians who provided first aid to Agafonov indeed made some mistakes, but none of them were fatal. "All the shortcomings were of a formal nature," – the experts said. – "Help to the victim was rendered in full. And to anticipate the development of Agafonov's trauma was not possible."

Although, originally charged with murder, Mirzaev was convicted on 27 November 2012, of negligent manslaughter and released by the court, his 15 months on remand having been taken into account.

On the 1st January 2017 The Russian fighter was shot three times with a high-powered BB gun, including once in the face, beat with a baseball bat and choked with chains in Moscow. He was later rushed to hospital, where he was in a stable condition after surgery to remove the bullets and he survived.

Mixed martial arts record 

|-
|Loss
|align=center|18–4
|Abdul-Rakhman Dudaev
|KO (punch)
|ACA 138: Vagaev vs Gadzhidaudov
|
|align=center|1
|align=center|4:06
|Grozny, Russia
| 
|-
|Loss
|align=center|18–3
|Arman Ospanov
|TKO (punches)
|ACA 105: Shakhbulatov vs. Oliveira
|
|align=center|1
|align=center|2:29
|Almaty, Kazakhstan 
|
|-
|Loss
|align=center|18–2
|Shamil Shakhbulatov
|KO (punch)
|ACA 99: Bagov vs. Khaliev
|
|align=center|1
|align=center|3:57
|Moscow, Russia
|
|-
|Win
|align=center|18–1
|Gleristone Santos
|KO (punch)
|ACB 90: Vakhaev vs Bilostenniy
|
|align=center|2
|align=center|4:03
|Moscow, Russia
|
|-
|Loss
|align=center|17–1
|Levan Makashvili
|Decision (unanimous)
|Fight Nights Global 54: Pavlovich vs. Kudin
|
|align=center|3
|align=center|5:00
|Rostov On Don, Russia
|
|-
|Win
|align=center|17–0
|Diego Nunes
|TKO (punches)
|Fight Nights Global 51: Pavlovich vs. Gelegaev
|
|align=center|1
|align=center|1:45
|Kaspiysk, Dagestan, Russia
|
|-
|Win
|align=center|16–0
|Dioginis Souza
|TKO (punches)
|Fight Nights Global 50: Fedor vs. Maldonado
|
|align=center|1
|align=center|4:13
|Saint Petersburg, Russia
|
|-
|Win
|align=center|15–0
|LiGe Teng
|TKO (punches)
|Oriental MMA Summit 2016
|
|align=center|1
|align=center|4:50
|Shandong, China
|
|-
|Win
|align=center|14–0
|Ilya Kurzanov
|Decision (unanimous)
|Fight Nights Moscow
|
|align=center|3
|align=center|5:00
|Moscow, Russia
|
|-
|Win
|align=center|13–0
|Kevin Croom
|TKO (punches)
|Fight Nights Dagestan
|
|align=center|2
|align=center|3:16
|Kaspiysk, Dagestan, Russia
|
|-
|Win
|align=center|12–0
|Ronny Gomez
|Submission (rear-naked choke)
|Fight Nights: Sochi
|
|align=center|1
|align=center|2:46
|Sochi, Russia
|
|-
|Win
|align=center|11–0
|Sebastian Romanowski
|TKO (punches)
|Fight Nights: Battle of Moscow 19
|
|align=center|3
|align=center|2:30
|Moscow, Russia
|
|-
|Win
|align=center|10–0
|Jose Tavares
|TKO (punches)
|Battle of the Stars 3
|
|align=center|1
|align=center|3:40
|Kaspiysk, Russia
|
|-
|Win
|align=center|9–0
|Yerzhan Estanov
|TKO (retirement)
|Alash Pride: Warriors of the Steppe
|
|align=center|2
|align=center|5:00
|Almaty, Kazakhstan
|
|-
|Win
|align=center|8–0
|Magomedemin Khazhgeriev
|Submission (armbar)
|N1 Pro: Nomad Pro MMA Cup 2014
|
|align=center|1
|align=center|N/A
|Grozny, Chechnya, Russia
|
|-
|Win
|align=center|7–0
|James Saville
|Decision (unanimous)
|Dare Fight Sports – Rebels of MMA
|
|align=center|3
|align=center|5:00
|Bangkok, Thailand
|
|-
|Win
|align=center|6–0
|Yerzhan Estanov
|Decision (unanimous)
|Great Battle
|
|align=center|3
|align=center|5:00
|Almaty, Kazakhstan
|
|-
|Win
|align=center|5–0
|Masanori Kanehara
|TKO (punches)
|Fight Nights: Battle of Moscow 4
|
|align=center|1
|align=center|1:47
|Moscow, Russia
|
|-
|Win
|align=center|4–0
|Roman Kishev
|Submission (armbar)
|United Glory 14: World Series Finals
|
|align=center|1
|align=center|3:10
|Moscow, Russia
|
|-
|Win
|align=center|3–0
|Evgeni Khavilov
|KO (punch)
|Fight Nights: Battle of Moscow 3
| 
|align=center|1
|align=center|1:02
|Moscow, Russia
|
|-
|Win
|align=center|2–0
|Marat Pekov
|Decision (unanimous)
|Fight Nights: Battle of Moscow 1
|
|align=center|3
|align=center|5:00
|Moscow, Russia
|
|-
|Win
|align=center|1–0
|Danila Turinghe
|Submission (armbar)
|Battle of Champions – Elista
|
|align=center|2
|align=center|4:55
|Elista, Russia
|
|-

References

External links 
 

1986 births
Russian male mixed martial artists
Dagestani mixed martial artists
Living people
Dargwa people
Avar people
People from Kizlyar
Russian sambo practitioners
Russian people convicted of murder
Russian shooting survivors
People convicted of murder by Russia
Featherweight mixed martial artists
Mixed martial artists utilizing sambo